John C. Servis (born October 25, 1958 in Charles Town, West Virginia) is an American Thoroughbred racehorse trainer who was relatively unknown until May 2004 when his horse Smarty Jones won the Kentucky Derby. The colt then went on to win the Preakness Stakes further increasing Servis' reputation. Servis' Cathryn Sophia won 2016 Kentucky Oaks, winning by 2-3/4 lengths over Land Over Sea.

In 2018, Servis won his first Breeders' Cup race with Jaywalk in the Breeders' Cup Juvenile Fillies.

Servis trains horses primarily out of Parx Casino and Racing in Bensalem, Pennsylvania. 

He was born into a family involved in the Thoroughbred racing industry. As a boy, he moved to Philadelphia, Pennsylvania where his father worked as a jockey.

Servis trained his 1,000th winner on May 1, 2007 at Philadelphia Park.
 
John is also the brother of trainer Jason Servis and brother-in-law to Florida Thoroughbred trainer, Edward Plesa.

References

1958 births
Living people
American horse trainers
People from Charles Town, West Virginia